Stephen William Buchanan Coleridge (31 May 1854 – 10 April 1936) was an English author, barrister, opponent of vivisection, and co-founder of the National Society for the Prevention of Cruelty to Children.

Biography

Coleridge was the second son of John Duke Coleridge, Lord Chief Justice of England, and Jane Fortescue Seymour, an accomplished artist. His grandfather was nephew to the famous poet Samuel Taylor Coleridge. At fourteen he was sent to the public school Bradfield College; this seems to have rankled since his father, grandfather and elder brother were all educated at the more prestigious Eton. He attended Trinity College, Cambridge, where he graduated in 1878.

Coleridge came to widespread public attention in England in 1903, when he publicly accused William Bayliss of the Department of Physiology at University College London of having broken the law during an experiment on a dog, thereby sparking the Brown Dog affair. Bayliss sued for libel and was awarded damages of £2,000.

Coleridge was also an accomplished landscape artist, who exhibited at the Alpine Club Gallery, the Suffolk Street galleries and the Royal Academy.

Selected publications

Broken Gods (1903)
Vivisection: A Heartless Science (1916)
Great Testimony Against Scientific Cruelty (1918)

Gallery

References

External links

 
 
 

1854 births
1936 deaths
Alumni of Trinity College, Cambridge
Anti-vivisectionists
British activists
British animal welfare scholars
British barristers
British writers
Stephen
National Society for the Prevention of Cruelty to Children people
People educated at Bradfield College
Younger sons of barons